Grandview Township is one of the twenty-two townships of Washington County, Ohio, United States.  The 2000 census found 1,834 people in the township, 877 of whom lived in the unincorporated portions of the township.

Geography
Located in the eastern corner of the county along the Ohio River, it borders the following townships:
Benton Township, Monroe County - north
Jackson Township, Monroe County - northeast
Independence Township - southwest
Ludlow Township - west
Washington Township, Monroe County - northwest corner

West Virginia lies across the Ohio River to the southeast: Pleasants County in the far south, and Tyler County otherwise.

The village of Matamoras is located in the eastern part of the township along the Ohio River.

Name and history
It is the only Grandview Township statewide.

Government
The township is governed by a three-member board of trustees, who are elected in November of odd-numbered years to a four-year term beginning on the following January 1. Two are elected in the year after the presidential election and one is elected in the year before it. There is also an elected township fiscal officer, who serves a four-year term beginning on April 1 of the year after the election, which is held in November of the year before the presidential election. Vacancies in the fiscal officership or on the board of trustees are filled by the remaining trustees.

References

External links
County website

Townships in Washington County, Ohio
Townships in Ohio